Lasiopetalum ogilvieanum is a species of flowering plant in the family Malvaceae and is endemic to the south-west of Western Australia. It is an open, spindly or rounded shrub with rusty-hairy young stems, narrowly egg-shaped to narrowly elliptic leaves and white or pink and dark red flowers.

Description
Flowering occurs from July to October.<ref name="FloraBase">{{FloraBase|name=Lasiopetalum ogilvieanum|id=5042}}</ref>

TaxonomyLasiopetalum ogilvieanum was first formally described in 1881 by Ferdinand von Mueller in Fragmenta Phytographiae Australiae from specimens he collected near the Greenough and Irwin Rivers. The specific epithet (ogilvieanum) honours Andrew J. Ogilvie, who accompanied Mueller on his expedition to Shark Bay.

Distribution and habitat
This lasiopetalum grows in heathy woodland from near Dongara to near Eneabba in the Avon Wheatbelt and Geraldton Sandplains biogeographic regions of south-western Western Australia.

Conservation statusLasiopetalum ogilvieanum'' is listed as "Priority One" by the Government of Western Australia Department of Biodiversity, Conservation and Attractions, meaning that it is known from only one or a few locations which are potentially at risk.

References

ogilvieanum
Malvales of Australia
Rosids of Western Australia
Plants described in 1881
Taxa named by Ferdinand von Mueller